Legionella longbeachae is one species of the family Legionellaceae. It was first isolated from a patient in Long Beach, California. It is found predominantly in potting soil and compost. In humans, the infection is sometimes called Pontiac fever. Human infection from L. longbeachae is particularly common in Australia, but cases have been documented in other countries including the United States, Japan, Greece and the UK.

The infection can be very serious, often leading to hospitalisation and sometimes death.

Like other Legionella species, person-to-person transmission has not been documented, but unlike other species, the primary transmission mode has not been proven, but likely is inhalation or aspiration of dust from contaminated compost or soil that contains the organism causing legionellosis.

Modes of transmission include poor hand-washing practices after gardening, long-term smoking, and being near dripping, hanging flower pots. Awareness of a possible health risk with potting mix protected against illness. Inhalation and ingestion are possible modes of transmission. Exposure to aerosolized organisms and poor gardening hygiene may be important predisposing factors to L. longbeachae infection.

Compost and potting mix warning labels

Compost must be handled with care, damped down with water to reduce dust before handling, and use of a face mask covering the nose and mouth to reduce the risk of inhaling the dust is needed, especially for those at high risk from infection.

Studies advocate the introduction of an industry standard that ensures the use of face masks when handling potting mix and attaching masks and warning labels to potting mix bags sold to the public.

Compost packaging in Australia has an L. longbeachae warning label. The New South Wales state government recommends that  people reduce exposure to potting mix dust by following the manufacturers' warning present on potting mix labels, including:

 Wetting down the potting mix to reduce the dust
 Wearing gloves and a P2 mask when using potting mix
 Washing hands after handling potting mix or soil, and before eating, drinking or smoking

Symptoms
Early symptoms include fever, chills, headache, shortness of breath, sometimes dry cough, and muscle aches and pain.

Most people who breathe in the bacteria do not become ill. The risk of disease is increased with increased age and smoking, and in people with weakened immune systems.

References

External links
Tasmanian Health and Human Services Legionella page
Type strain of Legionella longbeachae at BacDive -  the Bacterial Diversity Metadatabase

Legionellales
Bacteria described in 1982